Antoine Villedieu (born 8 March 1989) is a French politician from National Rally. He has been Member of Parliament for Haute-Saône's 1st constituency since 2022.

References 

Living people
1989 births
Deputies of the 16th National Assembly of the French Fifth Republic
21st-century French politicians
National Rally (France) politicians